Vrbata is a surname. Notable people with the surname include:

David Vrbata (born 1983), Czech ice hockey player
Radim Vrbata (born 1981), Czech ice hockey player, brother of David

Surnames of Czech origin